Two ships of the Royal Navy have borne the name HMS Pytchley.

  was a  minesweeper launched in 1917 and sold in 1922. 
  was a  launched in 1940 and scrapped in 1956.

Royal Navy ship names